Brocket 99 was a comedy audio tape that parodied aboriginal people in Canada.  It has been described as a "phenomenon" by some, and racist by others.

1986 tape
The premise of the Brocket 99 tape was that of a fictitious radio station broadcasting from Brocket, Alberta, on the Northern Peigan reserve (a real First Nations reservation 70 km west of Lethbridge, Alberta), hosted by a character named "Ernie Scar" and featuring other participants.

The tape stereotypes Canadian First Nations peoples as habitual users of alcohol, drugs and welfare, engaging in anti-social behavior, and low in intelligence. The content of the tape is a mixture of music, advertisements, news, sports, interviews and local announcements divided into two parts corresponding to the two sides of a cassette tape in common use at the time.  Music played on the tape included complete versions from AC/DC, Hank Williams Jr., The Romantics, Paul Revere & the Raiders, John Anderson, Doctor and the Medics and Dwight Yoakam, although AC/DC is the most used artist throughout the tape.  Advertisements on the tape were either original creations interspersed with vulgarity, racism, and stereotypical language for real products, such as for Lysol, or taken from legitimately produced radio commercials for companies such as Safeway, Penner's Men's, and Women's Wear in Taber, Alberta and Beaver Lumber. News, sports, interviews, and local announcements on the tape are largely original creations interspersed with factual entities, such as the Seattle Seahawks and Toronto Blue Jays, as well as non-existent entities, such as "Brocket Used Motors" and "Brocket Alcohol & Drug Abuse Hotline" created specifically for the tape. It is unconfirmed though realistically impossible that any of the music or produced or original advertising content for any of the businesses referred to in the tape would have authorized their use during the production of the tape, owing to the stereotypical and racist content used by the tape's creators.

The tape was created in 1986 by Tim Hitchner, a radio DJ in Lethbridge, Alberta, as a parody and not intended to be marketed. Hitchner worked as a radio DJ at CHEC, CKTA, and CKIZ-FM from 1985 to 1992. It is claimed that Hitchner was inspired to create Brocket 99 based on another underground tape circulating in 1986 called "AIDS Radio" that was a spoof of a homosexual radio station using stereotypical and bigoted references. The initial method of distribution from Tim Hitchner has not been documented, although its wider distribution has been described as viral. The tape has been described as an "international underground phenomenon".

Hitchner died February 12, 2011. On February 12, 2011, a fan site reported the then anonymous actor who played Ernie Scar had died at age 49, of myocardial infarction due to coronary artery disease. CKIZ's list of past employees on its website currently identifies Hitchner as the voice of Ernie Scar.

Documentary film 
In 2005, filmmaker Nilesh Patel produced and directed a documentary called Brocket 99 — Rockin' the Country, which examined the ongoing popularity of the tape and the relationship between aboriginal people and others in Canada.

The film won the Séquences Magazine Prize for best documentary film at the 2006 Montreal First Peoples Festival.

In 2004, prior to the release of the documentary, Mark Campbell of Global News interviewed Nilesh Patel to discuss the creation and subject matter of the documentary.  In addition to discussing prevailing Canadian attitudes on race and culture in the context of the documentary, Nilesh Patel also made an unsubstantiated claim during the interview that Mark Campbell was in denial of being the creator of Brocket 99. Contrary to this claim, no evidence has ever been presented implicating any individual other than Tim Hitchner in the creation of or participation in Brocket 99.  On February 15, 2015, Mark Campbell wrote a blog post confirming again that he was neither the creator of nor a participant in Brocket 99.

In the media 
In 2022, former Alberta Cabinet Minister Jonathan Denis and Calgary political operative Craig Chandler were featured in a video where they parodied Brocket 99, and their actions were deemed racist.  The video clips showed them using offensive stereotypes of First Nations.  In an interview Chandler said he was pictured in one of the videos and that "Some comedy is not politically correct, but this is a private function of my close friends. The video was taken by a close friend, I thought," he said.  Chandler was working on Danielle Smith's leadership campaign when the videos came out, and she fired Chandler over it.  Denis said he did not recall being in the videos but blamed his racist actions on previous problems with alcohol.  Denis then suggested the videos may be fake.

Later Chandler also said the videos were fake.  However, Hany Farid, an acknowledged expert in deepfakes, said, "But the knowledge of how these things are made, how difficult it would be to make them, I think it's extremely unlikely that these are deepfakes."

See also 
 Ethnic joke

Notes

External links 
Official Brocket 99 website
2006 documentary film

Brocket 99 on YouTube

Culture of Alberta
Canadian radio comedy
First Nations culture
First Nations in Alberta
Piikani Nation
Parodies
Race-related controversies in radio
Ethnic jokes